|-

6th overallGroup B2nd

6th overallGroup B2nd

7th overallGroup B3rd

7th overallGroup B2nd

9th overallGroup B4th

8th overallGroup B2nd

8th overallGroup B2nd

8th overallGroup B2nd

8th overallGroup B2nd

8th overallGroup B2nd

7th overallGroup B1st(lost qualification to Group Ain 2011)

8th overallGroup B2nd

8th overallGroup B2nd

8th overallGroup B2nd

8th overallDivision ALast place

9th overallGroup B1st(moving up to group A)

14th overallGroup B6th

|-

The Canada national bandy team (French: Équipe nationale de bandy du Canada) refers to the bandy teams representing Canada. Presently only the national men's senior team competes. There is the men's national team and the women's national team. Both teams are overseen by Canada Bandy (previously the Manitoba Bandy Federation) which is a member of the Federation of International Bandy (FIB). This article deals chiefly with the national men's team. For the women's team please see Canada women's national bandy team.

Bandy was first introduced to Canada in the city of Winnipeg in 1986. The initial organizations for bandy in Canada were called the "Bandy Federation of Manitoba" and "Canada Bandy Association/Federation". The men compete in the Bandy World Championship. Canada's national men's bandy team made their world debut at the 1991 Bandy World Championship.

While Canada is a country with a strong tradition in ice hockey and ringette, both sports are played on an ice rink and Canada does not have artificial ice rinks large enough to qualify as regulation sized bandy fields. As a result, Canada's national men's team practices at home on ice hockey rinks or other substitute surfaces. In the past, the Canadian women's bandy team practiced on a frozen water hazard on a Winnipeg golf course. Team Canada occasionally goes to the United States to practice in areas where full-sized bandy fields exist.

The Canadian team also continues to play in the annual Can-Am Bandy Cup.

History
While early forms of what is now called "bandy" have been recorded to have been played in Canada as far back as the 1850s after having been introduced by British soldiers, Canada did not form a national bandy team until the 1980s. The game was initially called "hockey on the ice". However, the sport of ice hockey, (which used the smaller ice rinks and pucks rather than the larger bandy fields) and a bandy ball, organized in Canada in 1875, absorbing bandy sports in the process and resulting in bandy's disappearance from North America. The sport did however formalize in England at the same time when ice hockey was being formalized in Canada. The first Team Canada for bandy was the Canadian men's national bandy team in 1991.

World Championship record
The men's team has competed in the annual Bandy World Championship several times starting in 1991.

Team Canada Senior

1991 Seniors 
The senior Team Canada squad made its world debut at the 1991 Bandy World Championship, in the championship in Helsinki, Finland.

1993 Seniors 
The senior Team Canada squad competed at the 1993 Bandy World Championship in Norway.

1995 Seniors 
The senior Team Canada squad competed at the 1995 Bandy World Championship in the United States.

1997 Seniors 
The senior Team Canada squad competed at the 1997 Bandy World Championship in Sweden.

1999 Seniors 
The senior Team Canada squad did not compete in the 1999 Bandy World Championship.

2001 Seniors 
The senior Team Canada squad did not compete in the 2001 Bandy World Championship.

2003 Seniors 
The senior Team Canada squad did not compete in the 2003 Bandy World Championship.

2005 Seniors
The senior Team Canada squad competed in the 2005 in Kazan, Russia, where they lost to the Belarus national bandy team for the "B" title.

2010 Seniors
At the 2010 Bandy World Championship Canada won Group B for the first time.  Canada, however, lost the Group A qualification match against the United States by a score of 6–9, and thus would again play in Group B at the 2011 Bandy World Championship in Kazan, Russia.  For this Championship Canada's team included 4 players playing professionally in club teams in Sweden.

2012 Seniors
The senior Team Canada squad competed at the 2012 Bandy World Championship in Almaty, Kazakhstan.

2014 Seniors 
The senior Team Canada squad competed at the 2014 Bandy World Championship in Irkutsk, Russia, 26 January – 2 February 2014.

2015 Seniors
The senior Team Canada squad did not participate in the 2015 Bandy World Championship. There were reports about them returning to the tournament for the 2016 Bandy World Championship (2016 WCS), but in the end they did not.

2016 Seniors
The senior Team Canada squad did not participate in the 2016 Bandy World Championship.

2017 Seniors
The senior Team Canada squad participated in the 2017 Bandy World Championship, where they won the Gold Medal of the Division B tournament, qualifying for Division A in 2018.

2018 Seniors
The senior Team Canada squad did not participate in the 2018 Bandy World Championship.

2020 Seniors
The senior Team Canada squad did not compete in the 2020 Bandy World Championship.

2022 Seniors
The senior Team Canada squad did not compete in the 2022 Bandy World Championship.

Gallery

References

External links
Official Site
New York Times article
Canadian 2010 World Championship Bandy Team Roster
Winnipeg Free Press Article on 2009 World Championship Team

National bandy teams
Bandy
Bandy in Canada
National sports teams of Canada